Millionaires in Prison is a 1940 American crime drama film directed by Ray McCarey and written by Lynn Root and Frank Fenton. The film stars Lee Tracy, Linda Hayes, Raymond Walburn, Morgan Conway and Truman Bradley. The film was released on July 12, 1940, by RKO Pictures.

Plot
Nick Burton is a convict who wields considerable influence among others behind bars. He befriends the prison doctor, Bill Collins, who is seeking a cure for a deadly virus (referred to as 'Malta fever' during the film)  and needs guinea pigs for his experimental drugs. A wealthy physician sentenced for reckless driving, Harry Lindsay, is persuaded to be of help.  Malta Fever is more commonly known as Brucellosis, which is a highly contagious zoonotic virus and no cure for it has ever been found.

Burton looks up two other rich inmates, Bruce Vander and Harold Kellogg, jailed for income tax evasion. They scheme to raise money for Collins' medical experiments. A pair of millionaire con men, James Brent and Sidney Keats, attempt a stock swindle even while behind bars, but Burton takes it upon himself to thwart their plans. The experiments produce a miracle cure for the virus, whereupon Burton and the doctor are both granted an early parole.

Cast 
Lee Tracy as Nick Burton
Linda Hayes as Helen Hewitt
Raymond Walburn as Bruce Vander
Morgan Conway as James Brent
Truman Bradley as Dr. William 'Bill' Collins
Virginia Vale as May Thomas 
Cliff Edwards as Happy
Paul Guilfoyle as Ox
Thurston Hall as Harold Kellogg
Chester Clute as Sidney Keats
Shemp Howard as Professor
Horace McMahon as Sylvester Odgen 'SOS' Schofield 
Thomas E. Jackson as Warden Tom Hammond
Elliott Sullivan as Tony Brody
Selmer Jackson as Dr. Harry Lindsay
Vinton Hayworth as 'Windy' Windsor

References

External links 
 
 

1940 films
1940 crime drama films
American crime drama films
American black-and-white films
Films scored by Roy Webb
Films directed by Ray McCarey
American prison drama films
RKO Pictures films
1940s English-language films
1940s American films